David William Smith (born 2 November 1974 in Grimsby, Lincolnshire) is a male retired hammer thrower from Great Britain.

Athletics career
He represented the United Kingdom in the men's hammer throw event at the 1996 Summer Olympics in Atlanta, Georgia. There he failed to reach the final, having thrown 69.32 metres in the qualifying round. He represented England in the hammer throw event, at the 1998 Commonwealth Games in Kuala Lumpur, Malaysia.

In 2002 he was ranked as the country's number one, but he retired in 2003.

Personal life
In 2015 Smith was sentenced to two years in prison for a sexual offence.

International competitions

References

External links
 

1974 births
Living people
Sportspeople from Grimsby
British male hammer throwers
English male hammer throwers
Athletes (track and field) at the 1996 Summer Olympics
Olympic athletes of Great Britain
Commonwealth Games competitors for England
Athletes (track and field) at the 1998 Commonwealth Games
World Athletics Championships athletes for Great Britain